Katoomba may refer to:

Katoomba, New South Wales
Katoomba (crater), on Mars

, a Royal Navy ship built in 1889
, a passenger ship built in 1913
, a Royal Australian Navy ship built in 1941